KDB Daruttaqwa (09) is the fourth and last ship of the Darussalam-class offshore patrol vessels. The vessel is in active service in the Royal Brunei Navy (RBN).

OPV program 
Brunei ordered the Darussalam class from Lürssen, the same company that Brunei contracted to sell the Nakhoda Ragam-class corvettes, and the first two vessels were delivered in January 2011. The second batch of two ships were delivered by 2014.

Construction and career 
KDB Daruttaqwa was built by Lürssen Werft company in Germany around the late 2000s. She is part of the second batch delivered from Germany to Brunei. KDB Daruttaqwa commissioned on 8 September 2014 at Muara Naval Base. All four sister ships work in the offshore patrol vessel role.

MNEK 2016 
16 April 2016, KDB Daruttaqwa was sent to Padang, Indonesia for Maritime Naval Exercise Komodo 2016 which is hosted by the Indonesian Navy from 12 to 16 April 2016.

LIMA’19 
KDB Daruttaqwa was sent on a Maritime Exercise in Langkawi, Malaysia for Langkawi International Maritime & Aerospace Exhibition 2019 (LIMA’19) which will last from 19–22 March 2019. She returned to Muara Naval Base on 5 April 2019.

PLAN 70th Anniversary 
On April 12, 2019, KDB Daruttaqwa left Muara Port for Qingdao, China to celebrate the 70th Anniversary of People's Liberation Army Navy. KDB Daruttaqwa later on joined ADMM-Plus 2019.

ADMM-Plus 2019 
KDB Daruttaqwa, HMAS Success, PLAN Xiangtan, INS Kolkata, INS Shakti, KRI Halasan, KRI Tombak, JS Murasame, JS Izumo, KD Lekiu, BRP Andres Bonifacio, RSS Stalwart, MV Avatar, ROKS Cheonjabong, ROKS Jeonbuk, ROKS Wang Geon, HTMS Bhumibol Adulyadej, USS William P. Lawrence and VPNS Quang Trung conducted ADMM-PLUS 2019 off Busan, South Korea. The ships have to conduct an exercise where they need to retake hostile vessels and rescue people overboard at sea.

All ships returned to Singapore to conduct check aboard cargo ships. KDB Daruttaqwa returned to Muara Naval Base on 20 May 2019.

Gallery

Further reading 

 MarineTraffic.com
 IMDEX 2019
 Shipspotting.com

References 

Royal Brunei Navy
Ships of Brunei
2012 ships